In Egyptian mythology, Petbe was the god of revenge, worshiped in the area around Akhmin, in central Egypt. His name translates as Sky-Ba, roughly meaning "Soul of the Sky", or "Mood of the sky". However, Petbe may be a Chaldean deity introduced by immigrant workers from the Levant, with his name being a corruption of the hybrid phrase Pet-(Ba'al), meaning "Lord of the sky". Early Christians compared Petbe to the Greek god Cronus.

References 

Egyptian gods
Vengeance gods
Cronus

ca:Llista de personatges de la mitologia egípcia#P